Molokini is a crescent-shaped, partially submerged volcanic crater which forms a small, uninhabited islet located in ʻAlalākeiki Channel between the islands of Maui and Kahoolawe, within Maui County in Hawaii. It is the remains of one of the seven Pleistocene epoch volcanoes that formed the prehistoric Maui Nui island, during the Quaternary Period of the Cenozoic Era.

The islet is a Hawaii State Seabird Sanctuary.

Recreation

Molokini is a destination for scuba diving, snuba, and snorkeling. Its crescent shape protects divers inside it from waves and the channel's powerful currents, though diving also takes place off the 300-foot (91.5-meter) sheer outer wall. In the morning, when winds are calmer, smaller tour boats also bring guests to snorkel off the outer wall.

Molokini is home to about 251 species of fish, many endemic (see Ecology Paragraph below). The best conditions occur in early morning. The water depth is 15–60 feet in the majority of the allowed dive spots.

Because Molokini attracts many boats, the Hawaii State Division of Boating and Recreation established mooring buoys and "Day Use Mooring Rules" for Molokini to protect against damage from dropped anchors.

Mythology
In Hawaiian legend, Molokini was a beautiful woman. She and Pelé, the fire goddess, were in love with the same man. The jealous Pele cut her rival in two and transformed her into stone. The woman's head is supposedly Puu Olai, the cinder cone by Makena Beach.

History

Potassium-argon dating indicates that Molokini erupted approximately 230,000 years ago. Archaeological evidence, primarily in the form of stone sinkers and lures, show that early Hawaiians visited Molokini to fish. They also likely harvested seabirds, eggs and feathers.

During World War II, the United States Navy used Molokini for target practice, as its shape is somewhat similar to a battleship. In 1975 and 1984, the Navy detonated in-place unexploded munitions found within the crater, resulting in the destruction of large areas of coral. This resulted in a public outcry. A thorough search and manual removal of unexploded munitions to deep water was carried out by volunteer divers as a result. A 2006 survey found no evidence of unexploded munitions on the islet. As a result of the extensive target practice, the southwest rim of the islet is damaged.

From the 1950s through the 1970s, commercial harvesting of black coral occurred in Molokini. In 1977 Molokini islet, the crater, and the surrounding  of underwater terrain were declared a Marine Life Conservation District (MLCD).

Ecology

Molokini crater is home to approximately 250 to 260 marine species. Most commonly observed among these are the black triggerfish, yellow tang, Moorish idol, parrotfish, raccoon butterflyfish and bluefin trevally. Due to constant exposure to park visitors and the long history as a conservation district, the fish of Molokini are comfortable with the presence of nearby divers. Small whitetip reef sharks and moray eels are occasionally seen in the crater, and red pencil urchins can be seen quite frequently.

The waters of Molokini contain 38 hard coral species and approximately 100 species of algae. Although quite dense on the seafloor, they are not as densely packed as they had historically been due to the constant tourism and activity there. The islet is home to at least two species of nesting seabirds — Bulwer's petrels and wedge-tailed shearwaters. Additionally great frigatebirds have been observed on Molokini islet.

Restrictions on access and activities
Molokini islet is federally owned and is a state seabird sanctuary. Thus, unauthorized landing is prohibited. Permission to land must be obtained both from the U.S. Coast Guard and the Hawaii Division of Forestry and Wildlife.

Regulations covering the Molokini Shoal MLCD (see History above) prohibit fishing, collection or removal of specimens, and fish feeding within its bounds. Additionally, dropping anchor within the MLCD is not permitted due to the potential of damage to the coral reef. Tour boat operators have been allocated fixed mooring points instead.

Snorkeling and scuba diving are by far the most popular activities at the crater. Visibility at Molokini regularly exceeds , and the inside of the crater is generally sheltered from strong winds and waves. The back wall of the island has been named one of the top 100 diving destinations in the world by scubadiving.com. This drift dive offers steep drop-offs  to the ocean floor's reef and underwater life.

Moorings
Molokini Crater requires permits for commercial vessels to moor within the crater. A study showed that over 300,000 visitors visited Molokini crater annually. This number of visitors is thought to have affected marine life inside the crater. A proposed bill in 2019, if put into effect, will decrease the number of moorings in the crater from over 20 to 12 total moorings. This will limit the number of visitors to the crater and help to preserve marine wildlife.

Gallery

See also

 Desert island
 List of islands

References

Islands of Hawaii
Geography of Maui County, Hawaii
Volcanic cones
Volcanoes of Maui Nui
Nature reserves in Hawaii
Protected areas of Maui County, Hawaii
Pleistocene volcanoes
Pleistocene Oceania
Cenozoic Hawaii
Protected areas established in 1977
1977 establishments in Hawaii
Underwater diving sites in the United States
Uninhabited islands of Hawaii